PowerQuest was a software company that produced utility software.  It was acquired by Symantec in 2003.   PowerQuest's market focus was on management of computer data storage, especially file systems and disk partitions.  Their products included PartitionMagic, DriveCopy, Drive Image, and ServerMagic.

PowerQuest was started in the basement of Eric J. Ruff in Orem, Utah. PowerQuest earned Mr. Ruff the 64th spot on the Inc. 500 list in 2000, and earned many awards for being one of the fastest growing software companies in the world.

References

External links 
 http://www.powerquest.com/ - Original web site (since replaced by Symantec web site)
  (Last Internet Archive copy from before Symantec acquisition)

Defunct software companies of the United States
Gen Digital acquisitions
Companies disestablished in 2003
Companies based in Orem, Utah